Young Rock is an American television sitcom based upon the life of professional wrestler and actor Dwayne Johnson, also known by his ring name "The Rock". The series is created by Johnson, Jeff Chiang and Nahnatchka Khan and premiered on NBC on February 16, 2021. The series has received generally positive reviews from critics. In April 2021, the series was renewed for a second season.  A holiday special episode aired on December 15, 2021, ahead of the second-season premiere on March 15, 2022. In May 2022, the series was renewed for a third season, which premiered on November 4, 2022.

Premise
The sitcom is organized around a frame story set in the early 2030s, beginning with Johnson running for office in the 2032 United States presidential election. Each episode involves Johnson participating in an interview or other conversation which leads him to flashback to a story from one of three periods of Johnson's life, with occasional episodes where all three periods are shown. In the first season, Johnson is depicted as a ten-year-old in Hawaii; as a high school student in Pennsylvania; and as a college student and football player at the University of Miami.

Cast and characters

Main
 Dwayne Johnson as himself in scenes set in the future
 Adrian Groulx as 10-14-year-old Dwayne, usually called Dewey by family
 Bradley Constant as 15-17-year-old Dwayne
 Uli Latukefu as 18–26-year-old Dwayne
 Joseph Lee Anderson as Rocky Johnson, Dwayne's father
 Stacey Leilua as Ata Johnson, Dwayne's mother
 Ana Tuisila as Lia Maivia, Dwayne's grandmother, Ata's mother
 Tuisila also plays the 1960's version of Lia
 Matthew Willig as André the Giant (season 2-present; recurring season 1)

Recurring

1982
(Note: All the wrestling recurring characters who appear in 1982 also appear in 1987 and the 1990s)
 Brett Azar as The Iron Sheik
 Nate Jackson as Junkyard Dog
 Kevin Makely as Randy Savage
 Fasitua Amosa and John Tui as Sika and Afa Anoa'i, better known as The Wild Samoans
 Wayne Mattei as Sgt. Slaughter
 Kiff VandenHeuvel as Pat Patterson (season 2- )
 Marshall Williams plays a Young Pat Patterson in the 1960s (season 3)
 Josh Thomson as Bob, Lia Maivia's assistant
 Ronny Chieng as Greg Yao (season 1), a rival promoter of Lia's who is scalping wrestlers
 Sarah Gattelleri as Miss Elizabeth (season 2)
 Dave T. Koenig as Mean Gene Okerlund (season 2)
 Antuone Torbert as Tony Atlas (season 2)
 Jacob Hadley as "Chuck"/Jeff Cohen (season 3)
 Jason Devon Jenkins as Mr. T (season 3)
 Pete Gardner as Liberace (season 3)
 Brock O'Hurn as Hulk Hogan (season 3)
 Mike Holley as Lars Anderson, a booker and wrestler for Ata's stable (season 3)

1987
 Lexie Duncan as Karen, teenage Rock's girlfriend (Duncan also plays Lisa, Karen's twin sister.)
 Bryan Probets as Principal Boggs
 Stephen Adams as Kevin, Teenage Rock's rival for Karen
 Grayson Waller as Ric Flair
 Jade Drane as "Rowdy" Roddy Piper (season 1)
Ben Vandermay plays Roddy Piper in season 3.
 Adam Ray as Vince McMahon (season 2- )
 Taj Cross as Gabe, Dwayne's best friend in high school
 Genevieve Hegney as Diane, Ata's employer
 Ryan Pinkston as Downtown Bruno (season 2- )
 Greg Larsen as wrestler Bob Owens (season 2)

1990s
 Emmett Skilton as Ed Orgeron
 Wavyy Jones as Russell Maryland
 Rich Morrow as Michael Irvin
 Lovensky Jean-Baptiste as 2 Live Crew member, Uncle Luke
 Robert Crayton as Warren Sapp
 Joshua Hoyo Jr as Mario Cristobal
 Montez Wilkins as Jessie Armstead
 Victor Gralak as Doug Flutie, a Calgary Stampeders player (season 2)
 Lucas Tranchitella as Jeff Garcia, a Calgary Stampeders player (season 2)
 Arlyn Broche as Dany Garcia, Dwayne's girlfriend/wife (season 2- )
 Mark Casamento as Coach Wally Buono (season 2)
 Mana Tatafu as Uncle King Tonga (season 2)
 Luke Hawx as Stone Cold Steve Austin (season 2- )
 Thuso Lekwape as Chilly Willy
 James Wright as Billy Crane
 Sam Ball as Mick Foley/Mankind (season 3)
 Nicholas Bernardi as Bret "the Hitman" Hart (season 3)
 Matthew Knight as Nightclub bouncer (uncredited)
 Eltony Williams as Chad Frost, a fictional wrestler(season 3)

2032
 Randall Park as a future version of himself who has retired from acting and now is the host of his own news show The Straight Line with Randall Park
 Kenny Smith as a future version of himself, now a solo sports show host, unlike Inside the NBA
 Rosario Dawson as General Monica Jackson, the VP candidate for Dwayne Johnson's presidential campaign
 Ata Johnson cameos as a future version of herself during an interview between Dwayne and Randall, and in the season 1 finale.
 Ed Orgeron cameos as a future version of himself during an interview between Dwayne and Kenny Smith
 Chelsey Crisp as Casey, a member of Dwayne's campaign staff (season 2)
 Christopher Chen as Sandy, a member of Dwayne's campaign staff (season 2)
 Michael Torpey as Senator/President Brayden Taft, Dwayne's opponent (season 2- )
 Jenna Kanell as Jamie, the camerawoman on The Straight Line with Randall Park (season 2, episodes 4 and 11)
 Dawnn Lewis as Prime Minister Angela Honig (season 3)

Guest stars
 Bryan Probets as Principal Bogg (season 1, episodes 2 and 5)
 Carly Daniels as Color Blind Karen (season 1, episodes 2, 8 and 11)
 Gaby Seow as Big-Hair Karen (season 1, episodes 2, 8 and 11)
 Jordana Beatty as Bonnie (season 1, episodes 2, 5, 8 and 11) 
 Karen Ceesay as Superintendent Broward (season 1, episode 2)
 Michael Torpey as Senator Brayden Taft (season 1, episode 9; mentioned in season 1, episode 11)
 Luke Hemsworth as Coach Erickson (season 1, episodes 10 and 11)
 Heather Maltman as Rookie FBI agent (season 1, episode 11)
 Clayton Watson as Calgary Man (season 1, episode 11)
 Sean Astin as Man (1990s) who sold Dewey a mattress/Julian, an old schoolmate who 2032 Rock has a Twitter war with.
 Rebecca Quin as Cyndi Lauper (season 3, episodes 1 and 12)
 Julian Marlon Samani as 1960s Louie Dondero, Pat Patterson's partner (season 3)
 Nick Rhys as Sean Connery (season 3)
 Mark Ashworth as Director Lee, director of You Only Live Twice (season 3)

Wrestler cameos
 Ivan So as Ricky "The Dragon" Steamboat (season 1, episode 6)
 Paul Paice as Captain Lou Albano (season 2, episode 2)
Joseph D. Reitman plays Captain Lou in season 3
 Michael Strassner as Jerry Lawler (season 2)
 Patrick Cox as Crusher Yurkov (season 2)
 James Bolton as Jeff Jarrett (season 2)
 Bowie Walton as Roman Reigns (season 2, as a child)
 Marcus Molyneux as Brian Christopher (season 2)
 Cooper Matthews as Brian Lawler (season 2, as a teenager)
 Colt Cabana as The Brooklyn Brawler (season 2, episode 8)
 Brad Burroughs as Michael "P.S." Hayes (season 2)
 Richard Carwin as Bill Dundee
 Eddy Clinton as Classy Freddie Blassie (season 3)
 Benjamin Arthur as Jake "the Snake" Roberts (season 3)
 Saxon Cardenas as Ken Shamrock (season 3)
 Miles Burris as Triple H (season 3)
 Anthony Darrell as Bad News Allen (season 3)
 Darrell R. Hill as Dusty Rhodes (season 3)
 Jeff Huth as Sting (season 3)
 Dane Davenport as Jim Crockett (season 3)
 Tim Bosby, Corey Chapman, Simon Cook, Adam Lamb, Ed McAlexander, Derek Law and Chris Wooley play unnamed wrestlers who fought against Rocky Maivia or The Rock (season 3)
 Sam Puefua as Young Peter Maivia (1960s), Dwayne's grandfather, Ata's father and Lia's husband (season 3)

Episodes

Season 1 (2021)

Special (2021)

Season 2 (2022)

Season 3 (2022–23)

Production

Development
On January 11, 2020, NBC gave a straight-to-series order to Young Rock, a comedy series based on Dwayne Johnson's early life created by Johnson and Nahnatchka Khan and produce the series with Jeff Chiang, Dany Garcia, Jennifer Carreras, Hiram Garcia, and Brian Gewirtz with Khan and Chiang writing the pilot. In November 2020, production on the series commenced in Australia. On January 15, 2021, it was announced that the series would premiere on February 16, 2021. On April 30, 2021, NBC renewed the series for a second season, again filmed in Australia. A holiday special episode titled as "A Christmas Peril" aired
on December 15, 2021, ahead of the second season premiere on March 15, 2022. On May 12, 2022, NBC renewed the series for a third season, which was filmed in Memphis, Tennessee. The third season premiered on November 4, 2022, following Lopez vs. Lopez as a part of NBC's Friday Comedy Hour block.

Casting
Three actors were cast to play Johnson at three ages from his youth. On September 30, 2020, Johnson revealed that Bradley Constant was cast as 15-year-old Johnson, Uli Latukefu as 18–20-year-old Johnson, Adrian Groulx as 10-year-old Johnson, Stacey Leilua as Johnson's mother, Ata Johnson, Joseph Lee Anderson as Johnson's father, Rocky Johnson, and Ana Tuisila as Johnson's grandmother, Lia Maivia. On August 3, 2021, Matthew Willig was promoted to series regular for the second season.

Release

Marketing
During the 2020 Macy's Thanksgiving Day Parade, an inflatable CGI float featuring Dwayne Johnson in his 20s was unveiled in promotion of the television show.

Home media
Universal Pictures Home Entertainment released the complete first season of Young Rock on DVD and manufacture-on-demand Blu-ray on March 29, 2022., with its second season will be released on DVD and Blu-ray also as manufacture-on-demand titles on November 8, seven months after the first season's home release.

Reception

Critical response
On Rotten Tomatoes, the first season has a rating of 90% based on 31 reviews, with an average rating of 7.70/10. The website's critical consensus reads, "Anchored by a winsome ensemble, Young Rock is an endearing peek behind the curtain of both Dwayne Johnson's childhood and the wild world of wrestling." On Metacritic, it has a weighted average score of 66 out of 100, based on 18 critics, indicating "generally favorable reviews".

Ratings

Season 1

Special

Season 2

Season 3

Accolades 
The series was one of 101 out of the 200 most-popular scripted television series that received the ReFrame Stamp for the years 2020 to 2021. The stamp is awarded by the gender equity coalition ReFrame and industry database IMDbPro for film and television projects that are proven to have gender-balanced hiring, with stamps being awarded to projects that hire women, especially women of color, in four out of eight key roles for their production.

Notes

References

External links
 
 

2020s American black sitcoms
2020s American political comedy television series
2020s American single-camera sitcoms
2020s American teen sitcoms
2021 American television series debuts
American biographical series
American professional wrestling television series
Cultural depictions of American men
Cultural depictions of actors
Cultural depictions of professional wrestlers
Dwayne Johnson
English-language television shows
NBC original programming
Television series about families
Television series about teenagers
Television series based on actual events
Television series by Universal Television
Television series created by Nahnatchka Khan
Television series set in 1982
Television series set in 1987
Television series set in the 1990s
Television series set in the 2030s
Television shows filmed in Australia
Television shows filmed in Georgia (U.S. state)
Television shows set in Florida
Television shows set in Hawaii
Television shows set in Pennsylvania